The Norwegian Second Division, also called 2. divisjon and often referred to as PostNord-ligaen for sponsorship reasons, is the third-highest level of the Norwegian football league system.

There are 28 teams divided into two groups, and at the end of the season the winner of each group earns promotion to the second-highest division, 1. divisjon. The teams finishing in second place in their respective group will qualify for the promotion play-offs, where they will face each other. The winner will play against the 14th placed team in 1. divisjon for promotion. The bottom three teams in each group are relegated to 3. divisjon.

2. divisjon is the highest league a reserve team can participate in, and only reserve teams from the Eliteserien clubs (first tier) are allowed to enter. The participation of reserve teams stirs debate from time to time.

History
Between 1963 and 1990, 2. divisjon was the second highest level of the Norwegian football league system, therefore the name of the third highest level was 3. divisjon. When the highest level was rebranded in 1991, this level changed its name to 2. divisjon. From 2009 to 2011, the official name of the league was Fair Play ligaen, and from 2012 to 2015 the name was Oddsen-ligaen (after the main sponsor Norsk Tipping's betting-game called Oddsen). The league is currently branded as PostNord-ligaen, sponsored by PostNord.

Current members

The following 28 clubs are competing in the 2023 Norwegian Second Division.

Winners

1991–1995 
All group winners, excluding second teams of top division teams, were promoted to 1. divisjon.

1996–2000 
Each group winner played qualification play-offs to decide which teams promote to 1. divisjon. Teams in bold promoted to 1. divisjon through qualification play-offs.

2001–2016 
All group winners, excluding second teams of top division teams, were promoted to 1. divisjon.

2017– 
Teams in bold were promoted to 1. divisjon.
Teams in italics were relegated to 2. divisjon.

Reserve teams

Reserve teams of clubs from the two top divisions can participate in the 2. divisjon. Reserve teams of clubs from the 1. divisjon can not play in the 2. divisjon, so if a team is relegated from the 1. divisjon, the club's reserve team will be relegated to the 3. divisjon regardless of their final position in the league.

Sponsorship 
From 2016, 2. divisjon has its title sponsorship rights sold to PostNord.

Records and statistics

Team records

Average attendances

Top ten most attended games

References

External links
Current 2. divisjon table, results and fixtures at Soccerway
2. divisjon stats at Fotballen.eu
DF-02 (divisjonsforeningen av 2002) an interest group for the 2. divisjon

 
3
Year of establishment missing
Norw
Professional sports leagues in Norway